Ulundurpet/Ulundurpettai railway station (station code: ULU) is a railway station on the Viluppuram–Tiruchirappalli section serving Ulundurpet, a town and taluka headquarters in Kallakurichi district, Tamil Nadu. It is one of the railway stations of the Tiruchirappalli railway division of the Southern Railway zone.

Location and layout
It is located on the NH 45 near the Ulunderpet Toll Gate, one of the largest toll plazas in South India. The station has a two platform.

Traffic
Of the numerous trains passing through the station, only the Madurai–Viluppuram passenger has a commercial halt, despite Ulundupet being a town panchayat as well as the headquarters of both the Ulundurpet taluk and the Ulundurpet state assembly constituency.

The nearest major railheads are:
  (20 km)
  (36 km)

References

Trichy railway division
Railway stations in Viluppuram district